William McInturff is a Republican pollster, the co-founder (and partner) of Public Opinion Strategies, and, along with Peter D. Hart, the lead pollster for the NBC News/Wall Street Journal polling series for the past decade. He was the lead pollster for John McCain in his 2008 bid for the office of United States President. He has built Public Opinion Strategies into the largest Republican polling operation, representing 19 American Senators and over 50 Congressmen. His work includes testing the Harry and Louise commercials that were run against the Clinton health care plan of 1993.

During a Q&A session on 18 October 2013 on C-SPAN Mr. McInturff explained why negative campaigning works against the healthcare law:

References

External links

Year of birth missing (living people)
Living people
Pollsters
Washington, D.C., Republicans